Alan Fanning (14 December 1932 – 14 March 2020) was an Australian rules footballer who played for the Hawthorn Football Club in the Victorian Football League (VFL).

Honours and achievements
Individual
 Hawthorn life member

Notes

External links 

2020 deaths
1932 births
Australian rules footballers from Victoria (Australia)
Hawthorn Football Club players
Kew Football Club players